"Dancing with Myself" is a song by the punk rock band Gen X, first commercially released in the United Kingdom in October 1980, where it reached number 62 on the singles chart. It was remixed and re-released by the band's singer/frontman Billy Idol as a solo artist in the United States in 1981, where the song reached number 27 on the US Billboard Hot Dance Club Play chart.
Nouvelle Vague covered the number in 2006 and released it on their album Bande à part.

Theme
The inspiration for the song occurred during a tour of Japan by the English post-punk band Generation X in mid-1979, when its vocalist/frontman Billy Idol and its bassist Tony James were struck by the sight of the young crowd in a Tokyo discotheque dancing with their own reflections in walled mirrors rather than with one another.

Production
The song was written and first recorded by Generation X during demo sessions in mid-1979 at Olympic Studios in West London (this demo-recording was first commercially released retrospectively on the long-player K.M.D.-Sweet Revenge (1998)). After that band had split later in that year Billy Idol and Tony James re-branded the act as 'Gen X', and in production sessions with Keith Forsey for a new long-player at AIR Studios in London in mid-1980 the song was re-recorded for commercial release as a single. The guitar parts of the song were a mix of the playing of three guitarists with distinctively differing styles, viz. Steve New playing the lead, Steve Jones playing rhythm, with another layer being added by Danny Kustow. On commercial sale in October 1980 as a pre-release single from the new band's forthcoming long-player Kiss Me Deadly (1981),  'Dancing with Myself' was a retail failure, reaching only #62 in the UK Singles Chart.

In 1981, Idol, now a solo artist after Gen X had broken up, had Forsey remix the record for its release as a single in the United States, fading down the guitar(s) and bass tracks from their dominance in the 1980 U.K. release and accentuating the vocal and percussion tracks to produce a more rhythmic sound for the American commercial market. It became his first hit single in the United States and launched his career there, two versions being issued: the 3:20 single version (which was later included on Idol's 11 of the Best compilation) and the 4:50 extended version that appeared on Idol's Don't Stop EP.

Music video
For the 1981 United States single release a music video for use on the newly launched MTV was made, directed by Tobe Hooper, with Billy Idol in a scenario drawn from the 1971 cinema film The Omega Man playing a lone figure in a post-apocalyptic cityscape besieged upon a skyscraper rooftop by partying mutant street-waifs.

Cover art
The portrait image of Billy Idol on the cover of the 1980 release was photographed by Iain McKell.

Formats and track listings

Gen X release

7″: Chrysalis – CHS 2444 (UK)
 "Dancing with Myself" (3:30)
 "Ugly Rash" (4:30)

12″: Chrysalis – CHS 12 2444 (UK)
 "Dancing with Myself" (4:06)
 "Loopy Dub" (5:08)
 "Ugly Dub" (3:05)

12″ Chrysalis – CHS 2488 (45 rpm)
 "Dancing with Myself"
 "Untouchables"
 "Rock On"
 "King Rocker" (produced by Ian Hunter)

Billy Idol release

7″: Chrysalis – CHS 2488 (US)
 "Dancing with Myself" (3:19) [Labelled as "Billy Idol featuring Generation X"]
 "Happy People" (4:23)

7″: Chrysalis – IDOL 1 (UK – 1983)
 "Dancing with Myself" (3:19) [Labelled as "Billy Idol featuring Generation X"]
 "Love Calling (Dub)" (5:33)

12″: Chrysalis – IDOLX 1 (UK – 1983)
 "Dancing with Myself" (6:05) [Labelled as "Billy Idol featuring Generation X"]
 "Love Calling (Dub)" (5:33)
 "White Wedding" (8:20)
 "Hot in the City" (5:20)

 "White Wedding" is the 12″ Shotgun mix, but not labelled as such.

Charts

Gen X version

Billy Idol version

Appearances in popular culture
 Swedish rock-reggae band Dag Vag released a Swedish version of the song called "Dansar med mig själv" on their 4th LP 7 lyckliga elefanter in 1982.
 Belgian rockband De Kreuners released a Dutch version of the song called "Ik dans wel met mezelf" in 1982.
 Used in Can’t Buy Me Love (1987 Film).
 In one episode of Beavis and Butt-Head, the titular duo watched the music video of this song and commented about it.
 A cover version by Blink-182 was featured on the compilation album Before You Were Punk and on Taylor Steele’s Loose Change film soundtrack.
  Used in the soundtrack of Gia (1998).
 Cover version by the Donnas used in Mean Girls (2004) soundtrack.
 Used in Flushed Away and Grown Ups 2.
 Used in the episode "Valley Girls" in season 2 of Gossip Girl in 2009.
 In 2019, the song was re-arranged and covered by Postmodern Jukebox featuring Chloe Feoranzo. The video has more than 2 million views on YouTube.
 Cover version by American Authors used in Valley Girl soundtrack in 2020
 Used in the episode '743' in season 2 of The Umbrella Academy in 2020.
 Used in episode 1 of Season 4 of Chilling Adventures of Sabrina in 2020.
 Cover version by Marieve Herington as Tilly Green used in the upcoming Big City Greens episode, "Dancing With Myself".

References

1980 songs
1980 singles
1981 debut singles
Generation X (band) songs
Billy Idol songs
Chrysalis Records singles
Song recordings produced by Keith Forsey
Songs about dancing
Songs written by Billy Idol
Songs written by Tony James (musician)